Stegommata sulfuratella, the banksia leaf-miner, is a species of moth in the family Lyonetiidae. It is native to Australia, where it has been recorded from Queensland to Tasmania. It is an adventive species in New Zealand.

The wingspan is about 15 mm. Adults are white, with some darker markings on the forewings.

The larvae mine the leaves of various Banksia species, including Banksia integrifolia and Banksia serrata.

References

External links
Butterflies and Moths of the World Generic Names and their Type-species

Lyonetiidae
Leaf miners
Moths of Australia
Moths described in 1880
Moths of New Zealand